Gordon Bennett Frost (October 19, 1881 – May 29, 1933) was an American football coach.  He served as the head football coach at Alfred University in Alfred, New York from 1903 to 1904 and at the University of Oregon for one season, in 1907, compiling a career college football coaching record of 9–8–1.  Frost attended Dartmouth College, where he played football in 1902.  He coached high school football in Seattle in 1905 and 1906.

Head coaching record

College

References

External links
 

1881 births
1933 deaths
American football tackles
Alfred Saxons football coaches
Dartmouth Big Green football players
Oregon Ducks football coaches
High school football coaches in Washington (state)
People from Fort Ann, New York
Players of American football from New York (state)